Henan Experimental Middle School or called Henan Experimental High School, is a middle school of the People's Republic of China, located in Zhengzhou, Henan's Jinshui District. It was founded in 1957 as the Affiliated Middle School of Zhengzhou Teachers' Vocational School, later becoming the Affiliated Middle School of Zhengzhou Teachers' College, the Affiliated Middle School of Zhengzhou University, and the Zhengzhou 40th Middle School before being given its present name in 1979.

As of 2006, official statistics stated that it enrolled 2,800 students, though other reports put its student body at 10,300. Along with students of the Zhengzhou First Middle School and the Zhengzhou Foreign Languages Middle School, students from Henan Experimental are said to have the best language abilities in the province; many students from the school apply to overseas universities, especially in the United States. Diplomas of its international division, which is jointly operated by the Nova Scotia, Ministry of Education and that of Henan province, are recognised by both the Canadian and Chinese governments. In a 2016 ranking of Chinese high schools that send students to study in American universities, Henan Experimental Middle School ranked number 47 in mainland China in terms of the number of students entering top American universities.

However, the school has been criticised for its participation in the trend of commercialisation of education, in particular for its high tuition fees and the 400% increase in the size of its student body from 2003-2006, which earned it a total revenue of RMB176 million.

References

Further reading

External links
Official homepage

Educational institutions established in 1957
Education in Zhengzhou
High schools in Henan
Experimental schools
1957 establishments in China
Junior secondary schools in China